This is a list of independent wrestling promotions in Canada, sorted by regional area, and lists both active and defunct "indy promotions."

West Coast

British Columbia

Canadian Prairies

Alberta

Saskatchewan

Manitoba

Central Canada

Ontario

Quebec

Atlantic

New Brunswick

Nova Scotia

CWF                   Timberlea   JP Simms    2007

Newfoundland and Labrador

Prince Edward Island

See also

Professional wrestling in Canada

References

Further reading

External links
Canadian Promotions at OWW.com

Independent wrestling promotions in Canada